Mesembria, modern Nesebar, is an ancient Greek city in Thrace, on the Black Sea coast of Bulgaria.

Mesembria or Messembria or Mesambria may also refer to:

Mesembria (Zone), the ancient Greek polis of Zone, on the Aegean coast of Western Thrace, Greece, whose archaeological remains were formerly identified as "Mesembria"
Mesambria (Aegean Sea), another ancient Greek settlement on the Aegean coast of Western Thrace (exact location unknown)
Mesimvria, Evros, a modern Greek village near Mesembria–Zone.